Semën Samsonovich Kutateladze (born October 2, 1945 in Leningrad, now St. Petersburg) is a mathematician. He is known for contributions to functional analysis and its applications to vector lattices and optimization. In particular, he has made contributions to the calculus of subdifferentials for vector-lattice valued functions, to whose study he introduced methods of  Boolean-valued models and infinitesimals.

He is professor of mathematics at Novosibirsk State University, where he has continued and enriched the scientific tradition of Leonid Kantorovich.<ref>Kutateladze, S.S., "Kantorovich's Phenomenon", Siberian Mathematical Journal '''' (Сибирский мат. журн.), 2007, V. 48, No. 1, 3–4, November 29, 2006.</ref> His father was the heat physicist Samson Kutateladze.

Selected books and articles
.
Gordon, E. I.; Kusraev, A. G.; Kutateladze, S. S. Infinitesimal Analysis. Updated and revised translation of the 2001 Russian original. Translated by Kutateladze. Mathematics and its Applications, 544. Kluwer Academic Publishers, Dordrecht, 2002.
Kutateladze, S. S. Fundamentals of Functional Analysis. Translated from the second (1995) edition. Kluwer Texts in the Mathematical Sciences, 12. Kluwer Academic Publishers Group, Dordrecht, 1996.
Kusraev, A. G.; Kutateladze, S. S. Subdifferentials: Theory and Applications. Translated from the Russian. Mathematics and its Applications, 323. Kluwer Academic Publishers Group, Dordrecht, 1995. 
Kutateladze, S. S.; Rubinov, A. M.  Minkowski Duality, and Its Applications. Russian Math. Surveys, 1972, Vol. 27, No. 3, 137–191.
Kutateladze S.S. Choquet boundaries in K-spaces. Russian Math. Surveys, 1975, Vol. 30, No. 4, 115–155.
Kutateladze S.S. Convex operators. Russian Math. Surveys, 1979, Vol. 34, No. 1, 181–214.
Kutateladze S.S. On Grothendieck subspaces. Siberian Math. J., 2005, Vol. 46. No. 3, 489–493.
Kutateladze S.S. What is Boolean valued analysis? Siberian Advances in Mathematics, 2007, Vol. 17, No. 2, 91–111.
Kutateladze S.S. The tragedy of mathematics in Russia.Siberian Electronic Mathematical Reports, 2012, Vol. 9, A85–A100.
Kutateladze S.S. Harpedonaptae and abstract convexity. Journal of Applied and Industrial Mathematics, 2008, Vol. 2, No. 2, 215–221.
Kutateladze S.S. The Farkas lemma revisited. Siberian Math. J., 2010, Vol. 51, No. 1, 78–87.
Kutateladze S.S. Leibnizian, Robinsonian, and Boolean valued monads, Journal of Applied and Industrial Mathematics, 2011, Vol. 5, No. 3, 365–373.
Kutateladze S.S. Nonstandard analysis: its creator and place. Journal of Applied and Industrial Mathematics'', 2013, Vol. 7, No. 3, 287–297.

See also
 John L. Bell
 Paul J. Cohen
 Forcing
 Jerome Keisler
 Model theory
 Influence of non-standard analysis
 Nikolai Luzin
 Leonid Kantorovich
 Sergei Sobolev
 Aleksandr Danilovich Aleksandrov

 Dana Scott

References

External links
Webpage at the Sobolev Institute of Mathematics
An Heir, Pavel Golovkin's film
Semёn Kutateladze about science, innovation and education (in Russian)
Semёn Kutateladze about science, innovation and education (in English)
Profile at zbMATH

Functional analysts
Operator theorists
Mathematical logicians
Mathematical economists
Variational analysts
Mathematicians from Saint Petersburg
Academic staff of Novosibirsk State University
Model theorists
20th-century Russian mathematicians
21st-century Russian mathematicians
1945 births
Living people
Novosibirsk State University alumni